Coleophora crossophanes is a moth of the family Coleophoridae. It is found in Maskeliya, Sri Lanka.

Taxonomy
Research has concluded that Coleophora crossophanes does not belong to the family Coleophoridae. It could belong to the family Momphidae.

References

crossophanes
Moths described in 1917
Moths of Asia